The Kenya Girl Guides Association (KGGA) is the national Guiding organization of Kenya. It serves 120,805 members (as of 2003). Founded in 1920, the girls-only organization became a full member of the World Association of Girl Guides and Girl Scouts in 1963. The patron is First Lady Lucy Kibaki.

Events
Each year on February 22, members of the guides and the Kenya Scouts Association gather in Nyeri, at the grave of Baden Powell, to celebrate Founders' Day at the grave.

See also
The Kenya Scouts Association
Elizabeth Nyaruai

References

External links
 Official website

World Association of Girl Guides and Girl Scouts member organizations
Scouting and Guiding in Kenya

Youth organizations established in 1920